Admiral Adair may refer to:

Charles Henry Adair (1851–1920), British Royal Navy admiral
Charles L. Adair (1902–1993), American rear admiral
T. B. S. Adair (1861–1928), British Royal Navy admiral